T. K. S. Elangovan (born 30 August 1954 in Chennai, Tamil Nadu, India) is an Indian politician. He was elected to the Rajya Sabha, the upper house of Indian Parliament from Tamil Nadu as a member of the Dravida Munnetra Kazhagam. He was earlier elected to the Lok Sabha, the lower house of the Parliament of India from Chennai North. He is also the Organisation Secretary of DMK. He is the son of Late TK Srinivasan also popularly known as Thathuva Medhai TK Srinivasan (Ex Rajya Sabha MP).

Political career 
He was actively participating in politics since school days. He became the Organisation Secretary of DMK after quitting his job. He was elected Member of Parliament in May 2009.

In June 2016, he was announced as the party's candidate for the Rajya Sabha biennial polls. On 3 June 2016 he was elected unopposed along with R. S. Bharathi.

Personal life 
Elangovan belongs to DMK. His daughter Madhavi is married to actor John Vijay.

References 

1954 births
Living people
India MPs 2009–2014
Dravida Munnetra Kazhagam politicians
Lok Sabha members from Tamil Nadu
Rajya Sabha members from Tamil Nadu
People from Thanjavur
Politicians from Chennai